Shelley is a given name and surname. In many baby name books, Shelley is listed as meaning "meadow’s edge" or "clearing on a bank". It is Old English in origin. As with many other names (Courtney, Ashley, etc.), Shelley is today a name given almost exclusively to girls after historically being male. It is commonly used as a nickname for  Michelle (and formerly as a variant of Shirley). Shelley is also a transferred surname used by those in Essex, Suffolk and Yorkshire, particularly in settlements where a wood/clearing was beside a ledge or hillside. Shelly is a common alternative spelling. It is featured in tile on the ceiling of the Library of Congress in Washington D.C.

Notable people with the name include:

Surname
 Adolphus Edward Shelley (1812–1854), the first Auditor-General in British Hong Kong
 Alex Shelley (born 1983), stage name of American wrestler Patrick Martin
 Alexander Shelley (born 1979), English conductor
 Arthur Shelley (fl.1905), British footballer 
 Barbara Shelley (1932–2021), English actress
 Bert Shelley (1899–1971), English footballer
 Brian Shelley (born 1981), Irish footballer
 Burke Shelley (1950-2022), Welsh musician, member of rock group Budgie
 Sir Bysshe Shelley, 1st Baronet (1731–1815), grandfather of Percy Bysshe Shelley 
 Carla Shelley (born 1965), film producer
 Carole Shelley (1939–2018), English actress
 Cindy Shelley (born 1960), British actress
 Danny Shelley (born 1990), English footballer
 David Shelley (1957–2015), American blues rock musician
 David Shelley (publisher), British book publisher
 Deck Shelley (1906–1968), American football player
 Duke Shelley (born 1996), American football player
 Elbert Shelley (born 1964), American football player
 Sir Frederic Shelley, 8th Baronet (1809–1869), cleric and landowner
 George Shelley (singer) (born 1993), English singer, member of group Union J
 George Ernest Shelley (1840–1910), English geologist and ornithologist
 George M. Shelley (1849–1927), Mayor of Kansas City, Missouri
 Gerard Shelley (1891–1980), British linguist, author and translator
 Gladys Shelley (1911–2003), American lyricist and composer
 Harry Rowe Shelley (1858–1947), American composer
 Howard Shelley (born 1950), British pianist and conductor
 Hugh Shelley (1910–1978), American baseball player of the 1930s and 1940s
 Jack Shelley (footballer) (1905–1979), Australian footballer 
 James Shelley (1884–1961), New Zealand university professor
 Jaz Shelley (born 2000), Australian basketball player
 Jeremy Shelley (born 1990), American football placekicker
 Jim Shelley (disambiguation), multiple people
 Jody Shelley (born 1976), Canadian ice hockey player
 Joe Shelley (1892–1966), Australian footballer
 John Shelley (disambiguation), multiple people
 Joshua Shelley (1920–1990), American actor
 Kate Shelley (1863–1912), Irish-born US railroad heroine
 Kenneth Shelley (born 1951), American figure skater
 Kevin Shelley (born 1955), American politician
 Lee Shelley (born 1956), American fencer
 Lilian Shelley (1892–c.1933), English music hall entertainer
 Louise Shelley (born 1952), American university professor
 Martha Shelley (born 1943), American writer
 Mary Shelley (1797–1851), English writer, author of the novel Frankenstein
 Mary Michael Shelley (born 1950), American folk artist
 Michael Shelley (disambiguation), multiple people
 Nancy Shelley (died 2010), Australian peace activist
 Norman Shelley (1903–1980), English actor
 Paul Shelley (born 1942), English actor
 Paul Shelley (politician) (born 1959), Canadian politician
 Percy Shelley (potter) (1860–1937), English potter
 Percy Bysshe Shelley (1792–1822), English poet, husband of Mary Shelley
 Percy Florence Shelley (1819–1889), son of Percy Bysshe Shelley and Mary Shelley
 Pete Shelley (1955–2018), English musician, lead singer of Buzzcocks
 Peter Shelley, British 1970s pop singer
 Rachel Shelley (born 1969), English actress
 Rebecca Shelley (1887–1984), American pacifist
 Rex Shelley (1930–2009), Eurasian Singaporean author
 Richard Shelley (died c.1586), English Catholic under Elizabeth I
 Richard Shelley (Grand Prior) (c.1513–c.1589), English diplomat 
 Rick Shelley (1947–2001), American science fiction writer
 Ronald G. Shelley (1932–2003), philatelist
 Samuel Shelley (1750–1808), English miniaturist and water-colour painter
 Sidney Patrick Shelley (1880–1965), relative of Percy Bysshe Shelley
 Steve Shelley (born 1962), American drummer, member of group Sonic Youth
 Timothy Shelley (1753–1844), English politician, father of Percy Bysshe Shelley
 Walter Shelley, 17th-century politician, colonist of Jamestown, Virginia
 Wanda Shelley (born 1969), American television producer
 Sir William Shelley (c.1480–1549), English judge
 Shelley baronets

Given name
 Shelley Berman (1925–2017), American comedian and actor
 Shelley Chaplin (born 1984), Australian wheelchair basketball player
 Shelley Duncan (born 1979), former baseball player
 Shelley Duvall (born 1949), American actress
 Shelley Hennig (born 1987), American actress
Shelly Hutchinson, American politician
 Shelley Jensen, American television director and producer
 Shelley Long (born 1949), American actress
 Shelley Malil (born 1984), Indian American actor
Shelley Ross, American television executive producer
 Shelley Rudman (born 1981), British athlete
 Shelley Sandie (born 1969), Australian basketball player
Shelley Steiner (born 1961), Canadian Olympic fencer
 Shelley Tanaka, Canadian author and editor
Shelley Tepperman, Canadian translator
 Shelley Winters (1920–2006), American actress

Code name
 F. F. E. Yeo-Thomas, S.O.E. operative who had "SHELLEY" as a code name during World War II

Fictional characters
James Shelley, the title character of Shelley (TV series)
 Shelley Levene, a main character in the stage play Glengarry Glen Ross, and the 1992 film of the same name
 Shelley Marsh, a secondary character on the Comedy Central show South Park
 Shelley Simon, One Tree Hill character
 Shelley Unwin, a character in the British TV series Coronation Street
 Shelley Winters, a main character in the popular webcomic Scary Go Round
 Shelly Johnson, one of the main characters in Twin Peaks

Animals
 Shelley (tortoise), a tortoise on Blue Peter

See also

 Shelly (disambiguation)
 Michelle (name)
 Shirley (name)

English feminine given names
English unisex given names